Merkavim Transportation Technologies Ltd., shortened to Merkavim, is the largest bus manufacturing company in Israel. They produce many different types of buses, including tourism coaches, urban buses, long-distance buses and minibuses. In addition to this, they also provide specialist buses, such as bullet-proof buses, prisoner-transport vehicles and VIP transport vehicles. The company was founded in 1946 and is jointly owned by Israeli vehicle-importer Mayer Cars and Trucks and by AB Volvo.

Bus models

Long distance buses

 Mars - Intercity bus

City buses
 Low Entrance Pioneer - Low entry/floor bus on VDL SB230 Chassis and Volvo B7RLE Chassis Gearbox Is ZF Ecolife and Man A69 18.290 HOCL NL Gearbox is Voith D854.5 and Mercedes Benz OC500LE Gearbox ZF Ecolife and MAN RC2 19.290 HOCL and Volvo B8RLE ZF Ecolife Transmission
 Low Floor NL
 Articulated BRT
 Low Floor Mercury- On Volvo B7L Chassis With Voith D864.3E

Coaches
 Apollo - Coach for tourism and special rides
 Apollo Premium - A new version of the Apollo

Minibuses
 City 22 - Minibus based on Mercedes-Benz Sprinter
 CORAL - shuttle minibus based on Mercedes-Benz Sprinter

Armored buses
 Mars Defender - Double rear axle

Special Models
 Apollo Premium VIP to business rides
 Mobile Library
 Prisoner Bus

Criticism

Involvement in Israeli settlements

On 12 February 2020, the United Nations published a database of companies doing business related in the West Bank, including East Jerusalem, as well as in the occupied Golan Heights. Merkavim was listed on the database on account of its activities in Israeli settlements in these occupied territories,.

See also
 Ha'argaz, another Israeli bus manufacturer

References

External links

 Merkavim official site

Defense companies of Israel
Bus manufacturers of Israel
Manufacturing companies established in 1946